is a 2012 Japanese erotic horror film directed by Kazuya Ogawa.

Cast
 Emi Ito
 Akari Hoshino
 Ren Ayase
 Yuki Maeda
 Jordon Cheung

References

External links
 
 

2012 films
2012 horror films
Japanese horror films
Japanese slasher films
2010s Japanese films
Films set in motels